The Flag of the Department of Boyacá is the official flag and symbol of the Colombian Department of Boyacá. 

The flag was approved by Ordinance 47 of 1967 and Decrees 218 and 495 of 1968 by the Governor of Boyacá. The flag is similar in dimensions to the flags of Suriname and Thailand. 

The Flag of Boyacá is made up of five horizontal stripes. The extreme superior (first) and inferior (fifth) stripes of green color occupy a 1/6 of the flag and mean faith, devotion to service, respect and the hope of the people of Boyaca, it also symbolizes the fertility of Boyaca's countryside and the emerald green of the land.

The stripes close to the central stripe (second and fourth) colored white are also 1/6 of the flag and mean the love of the people from Boyaca for their Department, to their thoughtfulness and dedicated and decisive virtues to maintain the unity of Boyaca.

The central red stripe occupies 1/3 of the flag and symbolizes the blood of those who sacrificed their lives during the War of Independence from Spain in the fields of Tame, Pisba, Socha, Gámeza, in the Battle of Boyacá.

References

Official information about Boyaca; Flag of Boyaca 

Flags of the departments of Colombia
Boyacá
Boyacá Department